Aykut Aydun Yanukov (born 8 April 1995) is a Bulgarian footballer who plays as a winger for Maritsa.

Career
Yanukov began his career in his hometown club Lokomotiv Plovdiv but left the team in September 2017.

In June 2018, he joined Maritsa Plovdiv.

Club statistics

References

External links

Living people
1995 births
Footballers from Plovdiv
Bulgarian people of Turkish descent
Bulgarian footballers
First Professional Football League (Bulgaria) players
Second Professional Football League (Bulgaria) players
Gamma Ethniki players
PFC Lokomotiv Plovdiv players
FC Oborishte players
FC Maritsa Plovdiv players
FC Lokomotiv Gorna Oryahovitsa players
Bulgarian expatriate footballers
Bulgarian expatriate sportspeople in Greece
Expatriate footballers in Greece
Association football wingers